Avery Cornburgh (1430 – 2 February 1487) was an English politician and sea captain who was Under-Treasurer of England from 1483 to 1487 and Keeper of the Great Wardrobe in the Royal Household from 1486 to 1487.

Career 
He was a Member (MP) of the Parliament of England for Cornwall 1463 and 1467 and probably also for a Cornish seat in 1472–5. He was MP for Plymouth in 1478, 1483, 1485 and also probably also for a Cornish seat in 1484.

In the Royal Household, he was a Yeoman of the Crown and Chamber from 1455 to 1474 then an Esquire of the Body and Sea captain from 1474 to 1485. He was Under-Treasurer of England 1483-87 and Keeper of the king's Great Wardrobe from 1486-87.

In the Duchy of Cornwall, he was Controller of Mines from 1455 then keeper of Launceston Castle, water bailiff of Plymouth and Escheator (or Feodary) in Cornwall and Devon in 1460. Controller of Tin Mines in Cornwall, keeper of the Fowey and Carrybullock, and keeper of Restormel Castle and Controller of mines from 1483. He was JP for Cornwall from 1463 and Essex from 1468, sheriff of Cornwall in 1464-5 and 1468-9 and sheriff of Essex and Hertfordshire 1472-3 and 1477-8. He was responsible for buying the ship the 'John Evangelist' in Dartmouth for the Royal Navy in 1463. He was also sea captain of the ship the 'Grace Dieu' in 1480.

Family 
He married Beatrice Brewster probably a daughter of John Brewster of Dover’s, Essex, and his wife Margaret.
 He lived at Dover’s in Essex and Bere Ferrers in Devon. He owned Hatters, Dagenham from 1482 to 1487. He also lived at Gooshays, Essex.

He died on 2 February 1487 and was buried at Romford, Essex.

References 

1430 births
1487 deaths
English MPs 1463
English MPs 1467
English MPs 1478
English MPs 1483
English MPs 1485
15th-century English politicians
People of the Wars of the Roses
High Sheriffs of Cornwall
High Sheriffs of Essex
High Sheriffs of Hertfordshire
English justices of the peace